Bjørge Lillelien (29 March 1927 – 26 October 1987) was a Norwegian sports journalist and commentator for the Norwegian Broadcasting Corporation. He was considered to be a popular and engaging personality who commentated on many sports, particularly winter sports and football. It was not unusual for Norwegians to turn off the sound on the TV and listen to him on the radio instead.

In September 1981 he came to international prominence when he said “Maggie Thatcher your  boys took a hell of a beating” in commentary following Norway's 2–1 victory against England in a World Cup qualifier.

Career
Lillelien went to Northwestern University to study journalism in 1948. After going back to Norway for his military service, he got a job in the newspaper Fremtiden, after which he joined the Norwegian broadcasting network.

In 1963 he began a long-term working relationship with former Olympic champion skier Håkon Brusveen at a cross country ski race at Holmenkollen. This collaboration would last for the rest of Lillelien's working days. Brusveen continued to work for NRK after Lillelien's death.

Although privately Lillelien was quite reserved and reflective, he developed a gregarious on-air persona. He said "We shouldn't necessarily make a boring radio programme even if it is a boring football match. We should make a sports show that excites people".

He continued to work in broadcasting until just before his death from cancer in 1987.

"Your boys took a hell of a beating"
Lillelien commentated on radio on Norway's 2–1 victory against England in a World Cup UEFA qualifier in Oslo on 9 September 1981. At the end of the match, alternating between the English and Norwegian language, he exultantly proclaimed amidst scenes of jubilant Norway supporters and players in the football stadium:

"We are best in the world! We have beaten England! England, birthplace of giants",

before taunting a roll call of English historical figures:

"Lord Nelson, Lord Beaverbrook, Sir Winston Churchill, Sir Anthony Eden, Clement Attlee, Henry Cooper, Lady Diana, vi har slått dem alle sammen, vi har slått dem alle sammen! (we have beaten them all, we have beaten them all!). Maggie Thatcher, can you hear me? Maggie Thatcher ... your boys took a hell of a beating! Your boys took a hell of a beating!"

A significant portion of his excitement was due to how English football was held in very high regard in Norway at the time, as it was often easier to watch the Football League First Division on television in Norway than in England during the 1970s, with one match broadcast live each weekend, and with score updates from other simultaneous matches.

Although the broadcast was initially meant solely for the Norwegian home audience its content soon made its way across the North Sea and became legendary in the history of sports commentary in England. In 2002 it topped a list of the “10 greatest bits of commentary ever” in The Guardian newspaper.

Full Norwegian/English version

The full Norwegian/English version reads as follows:

"Vi er best i verden! Vi er best i verden! Vi har slått England 2–1 i fotball!! Det er aldeles utrolig! Vi har slått England! England, kjempers fødeland. Lord Nelson, Lord Beaverbrook, Sir Winston Churchill, Sir Anthony Eden, Clement Attlee, Henry Cooper, Lady Diana--vi har slått dem alle sammen. Vi har slått dem alle sammen.

"Maggie Thatcher can you hear me? Maggie Thatcher, jeg har et budskap til deg midt under valgkampen. Jeg har et budskap til deg: Vi har slått England ut av Verdensmesterskapet i fotball. Maggie Thatcher, som de sier på ditt sprog i boksebarene rundt Madison Square Garden i New York: Your boys took a hell of a beating! Your boys took a hell of a beating!"

Translated version

The full version, completely translated to English:

"We are the best in the world! We are the best in the world! We have beaten England 2-1 in football!! It is completely unbelievable! We have beaten England! England, birthplace of giants. Lord Nelson, Lord Beaverbrook, Sir Winston Churchill, Sir Anthony Eden, Clement Attlee, Henry Cooper, Lady Diana--we have beaten them all. We have beaten them all.

"Maggie Thatcher can you hear me? Maggie Thatcher, I have a message for you in the middle of the election campaign.  I have a message for you: We have knocked England out of the football World Cup. Maggie Thatcher, as they say in your language in the boxing bars around Madison Square Garden in New York: Your boys took a hell of a beating! Your boys took a hell of a beating!"

Parodies and homages
In 2002 Lillelien's words were designated the greatest piece of sports commentary ever by The Observer'''s Sport Monthly magazine. Such is its place in British sporting culture that parodies of the commentary have been written to celebrate domestic sporting victories, such as the following when the England cricket team beat Australia to regain the Ashes in September 2005:"Kylie Minogue! Steve Irwin! Holly Valance! Crocodile Dundee! Natalie Imbruglia! Ian Thorpe! Mrs. Mangel! Can you hear me? Your boys took one hell of a beating!"And again, when England's cricket team finally won a game against New Zealand in the 2006/7 one-day series, the BBC's web coverage came up with:"Dame Kiri te Kanawa, Peter Jackson, Neil Finn, Sir Edmund Hillary, Jonah Lomu - we have beaten them all! Helen Clark, can you hear me? Your boys took one hell of a beating!"Following Scotland's 2–1 victory against Norway in Oslo in September 2005, the Daily Record parodied the quote, using known Norwegians:"King Olaf, Roald Amundsen, Liv Ullmann, Edvard Munch, Vidkun Quisling, Thor Heyerdahl, Henrik Ibsen, Edvard Grieg, Monty Python's Norwegian Blue, Morten Harket, and Anni-Frid from ABBA. You boys took a helluva beating!"

The Deputy Editor of the Daily Record at the time, Murray Foote, later issued an apology for the inclusion of Vidkun Quisling in the quotation:"While I naturally assumed Quisling was not one of Norway's favourite sons, I was truly unaware of the deep loathing his name engenders amongst your countrymen. Had I been aware of this, I would not have used his name and I apologise unreservedly for the offence it caused."

Following Manchester University winning University Challenge against the University of Cambridge Pembroke College in March 2012, a commentator for the Manchester student newspaper observed "We have beaten Pembroke College, Cambridge! Cambridge, birthplace of giants. Rab Butler, Clive James, Ted Hughes, William Pitt the Younger, Eric Idle, Peter Cook, Bill Oddie! Bill Oddie, can you hear me? Your boys took a hell of a beating!"

The speech is also parodied in the 2001 British drama film Mean Machine'', starring Vinnie Jones. In the film, at the conclusion of the match between the guards and the prisoners at the fictional Longmarsh prison, in a 3–2 win for the prisoners, the commentators, Bob Likely (Jason Flemyng) and Bob Carter (Jake Abraham) quoted "Guards of Pentonville, Guards of Wandsworth, Walton nick in Liverpool, Policemen of Britain, Traffic Wardens, Parole officers, Wheel clampers, your boys have taken a helluva beating today, a helluva beating!".

See also
Huang Jianxiang, Chinese football commentator with a similarly memorable match commentary
Guðmundur Benediktsson, Icelandic football commentator, also with a similarly memorable match commentary

Notes

Citations

Bibliography
 (Limited access for URL-addresses only from Norwegian IP addresses.)
 (Limited access for URL-addresses only from Norwegian IP addresses.)
 (Limited access for URL-addresses only from Norwegian IP addresses.)

External links

Observer - The 10 greatest bits of commentary ever
Tribute (in Norwegian) on NRK website
Newspaper commentary on the Daily Record article and the inclusion of Quisling (in Norwegian)
Article describing official apology from Daily Record (in Norwegian, with full apology in English)

1927 births
1987 deaths
People from Røyken
Norwegian sports broadcasters
Norwegian sports journalists
Norwegian radio personalities
NRK people
Norwegian association football commentators
20th-century Norwegian writers